Sambit Patra (born 13 December 1974) is an Indian politician and has served as the National spokesperson of the Bharatiya Janata Party since 2014 and currently serving as a chairman in tourism department. Patra had his first job at Hindu Rao Hospital. He was appointed as an independent director of the board of Oil and Natural Gas Corporation Limited (ONGC) in 2017. On 30 November 2021, Patra was appointed as the Chairman of the India Tourism Development Corporation.

Early life 
Patra was born in an Odia family to Rabindra Nath Patra on 13 December 1974 in Bokaro Steel City, then part of Dhanbad district of the state of Bihar, which is now a part of Bokaro district of Jharkhand. His father worked in the Bokaro Steel Plant. He did his primary and intermediate schooling in Chinmaya Vidyalaya, Bokaro. He did his MBBS from Veer Surendra Sai Institute of Medical Sciences and Research, Burla, Sambalpur, Odisha in 1997 and his Master of Surgery (MS) in General Surgery from Shri Ramachandra Bhanj Medical College, Cuttack, Utkal University in 2002. He Qualified UPSC Combined Medical Services in 2003 and joined Hindurav Hospital as a Medical Officer.

Political career
Patra's political career started in 2010 when he joined the Bharatiya Janata Party as a spokesperson for its Delhi unit. In 2012, Patra lost the municipal election as the BJP's candidate from Delhi's Kashmiri Gate and at the same time resigned from his job to pursue politics full-time. In the run-up to the Lok Sabha elections in 2014, Patra campaigned for the BJP and gained visibility on national television. When the BJP came to power, Patra became its national spokesperson. In 2017, Appointments Committee of the Cabinet (ACC) appointed him as a non-official director of ONGC.

Sambit Patra contested the Puri Lok Sabha seat in the 2019 Indian general election, and lost to sitting Biju Janata Dal (BJD) member Pinaki Misra by 11,800 votes, or an approximately 1% margin.

Controversies
In September 2017, Patra was appointed as an independent/Non-Official Director (NOD) of the Oil and Natural Gas Corporation Ltd (ONGC) Board for a renewable term of three years. Him being an active member and official spokesperson of the ruling party (BJP) was viewed as a violation of the companies act and subsequently challenged in the Delhi High Court by Energy Watchdog (NGO). The petition also alleged the entire selection process to be "flawed". In November 2017, The Delhi High Court dismissed the PIL on grounds of it being "Unsubstantiated" and "Without Merit". The court also stated that questioning Patra's independence to discharge his official duties as an independent director merely on his association with the ruling party (BJP) would be "Highly Inappropriate". Later, the Supreme Court asked the NGO who filed the PIL to "Serve a copy to the Union of India". The SC Bench posted the matter for a later date and mentioned "After hearing preliminary arguments, we can issue formal notice."
In February 2020, Patra tweeted a fake video of ex-INC MLA Naseem Khan chanting 'Pakistan Zindabad', which made the latter file a police complaint against Patra in Mumbai.
On 18 May, a tweet by Sambit Patra, which included pictures of a document "toolkit" containing social media measures allegedly used by the Congress to hurt Indian Prime Minister Narendra Modi's image during the second wave of the COVID-19 pandemic, was flagged by Twitter as manipulated media. This decision by Twitter was possibly in response to the Congress lodging a complaint with Twitter's California headquarters to suspend accounts for prominent BJP leaders for allegedly "spreading misinformation and unrest in the society". The Ministry of Electronics and Information Technology responded with a letter to Twitter alleging unilateral, arbitrary and politically biased decision on Twitter's part in passing judgement on Patra's case, which was under investigation.
Patra was among two doctors under the Delhi Medical Council scanner for alleged negligence in post-operative care. The complaint dated 1 August 2014 is “under consideration”, according to the council's website.
During a Heated argumentative session on 12 August 2020, in a Tv debate with Rajiv Tyagi,  Sambit aggressively yelled and referred to him as "Jaichand", and a false Hindu who appears wearing a Tilak. The spokesperson of Congress party, suffered a heart attack just after the debate was over. He was rushed to the hospital, but after some time of treatment, was declared dead. The congress party alleged, that the aggressive methods of the modern debating methods are the reason Rajiv Tyagi died. Many in the twitter had even lashed and declared Sambit Patra as a murderer.

References

External links
 Sambit Patra on Twitter

Indian surgeons
1974 births
Living people
Bharatiya Janata Party politicians from Odisha
People from Bokaro Steel City